Vĩnh Phước may refer to several places in Vietnam, including:

Vĩnh Phước, An Giang, a commune of Tri Tôn District
Vĩnh Phước, Khánh Hòa, a ward of Nha Trang, Vĩnh Phước Province
Vĩnh Phước, Sóc Trăng, a ward of Vĩnh Châu, Sóc Trăng Province
Vĩnh Phước A and Vĩnh Phước B, communes in Gò Quao District, Kiên Giang Province